Cipher in the Snow is a short story written by Jean Mizer Todhunter about the death of an ostracized teenager. It was later made into a short film by Brigham Young University in 1973.

Background
Cipher in the Snow, written by Jean Mizer Todhunter, an Idaho teacher, counselor and guidance director, was first published Volume 50 of the NEA Journal in 1964. It won first prize in the first Reader's Digest/NEA Journal writing competition and received a reprint in Today's Education in 1975.

BYU Motion Picture Studios made a short film based upon the story in 1973. The film was produced by Wetzel Whitaker and Keith Atkinson, with a screenplay by Carol Lynn Pearson. A DVD of the film is available through BYU's Creative Works Office. Both the film and the story have since been used in moral education as part of anti-bullying initiatives.

Synopsis 
The story is about an ostracized teenager, Cliff Evans, who following his parents' divorce has no friends and becomes a completely withdrawn "cipher". Then on a school bus, he asks to be let off, and collapses and dies in the snow near the roadside. His school's math teacher is asked to notify his parents and write the obituary. Though listed as Cliff's favorite teacher, he recalls that he hardly knew him. After getting a delegation to go to the funeral - it's impossible to find ten people who knew him well enough to go - the teacher resolves never to let this happen to another child in his charge. It is implied that his death was because no one loved him.

References

External links 

 "Cipher in the Snow" at Mormon Literature & Creative Arts Database
 
 Cipher in the Snow (1973) at ldsfilm.com

1973 films
1973 drama films
Christian fiction
1970s English-language films